Samgye-tang or ginseng chicken soup, meaning ginseng (Kor. sam) - chicken (Kor. gye) - soup (Kor. tang) in Korean, consists primarily of a whole young chicken (poussin) filled with garlic, rice, jujube, and ginseng. Samgye-tang is a Korean traditional soup for body health. Samgye-tang is a representative summer health food. Soup made with chicken that is slightly larger than the chick is called Yeonggye Baeksuk, and the chicken is divided into half is called Banggye-tang.

History 
During the Joseon Dynasty (1392-1897), people enjoyed the numerous chicken soup dishes that were similar to Samgye-tang, including Yeongye-tang, Chonggye-tang, and Hwanggye-tang.  While it was the custom to make a soup with young chicken and serve it to elders during the summer days, the chicken boiled with milkvetch roots and its broth were served to the sick queen during King Injo's reign. However, the description of the dish that most closely resembles today's form of Samgye-tang can be found in Joseon Yorijaebeop, the cookbook Shinyoung Bang, the professor of Ewha Womans University, wrote in 1917 to compile the information on how to make various traditional dishes of Joseon. In the book, it is described that Dakguk (닭국), or chicken soup, is made by gutting a chicken and stuffing the inside with three spoons of glutinous rice and one spoon of ginseng powder, followed by tying up the opening and boiling the chicken with ten bowls of water. During the Japanese colonial era, the Japanese officials who investigated the cultures of former Joseon noted that rich families boiled the chicken stuffed with ginseng and used the broth as medicine in summer.

The dish began to be commercially sold at restaurants around 1940s and under the name Gyesam-tang (() in 1950s, which meant chicken ginseng soup. With the supplying of modern refrigerators in Korea,  it became possible to preserve a ginseng as whole instead of powder. Thus, since 1960s, it became more common to stuff the chicken with a whole piece of ginseng instead of powder, reaching today's form of the dish. To emphasize the medicinal effects of the ginseng in the soup, many people since then have started calling the dish Samgye-tang (ginseng chicken soup) instead of Gyesam-tang (chicken ginseng soup).

Custom 
It is the custom in Korea to eat Samgye-tang during hot summer days in order to replenish the nutrients that were lost through the sweating and physical activities. It is especially popular to eat this chicken soup on sambok (삼복) days, which are three distinct days of the lunar calendar—Chobok (초복), Jungbok (중복), and Malbok (말복)—commonly among the hottest and most sultry summer days in Korea.

Some specialty restaurants in South Korea serve only samgyetang, having gained local popularity through their special recipes for the dish, which are often kept as secrets. The dish is sometimes accompanied by a small complimentary bottle of insam-ju (ginseng wine) in certain restaurants.

Recipe 
The recipe for Samgye-tang is to put glutinous rice, garlic and jujube wrapped in clean cloth in the stomach of the gutted chicken, and boil it in a pot with plenty of water to get it out when the meat is fully cooked. Ginseng is wrapped in a cloth, put in soup, and the ingredients of ginseng are thickened, so it is seasoned with salt to drink only the soup, or seasoned meat in the soup. However, if ginseng is mixed with glutinous rice and put into a chicken, the nutrients of ginseng permeate the chicken bones, reducing the nutrients of ginseng. In addition to ginseng, it is also eaten with poison ivy, cedar, and abalone. Some say that jujube should not be eaten because it absorbs the bad ingredients of Samgye-tang, but it is not true and can be eaten.

Although it is considered standard to add young chicken and ginseng for 6 years as ingredients in Samgye-tang, many restaurants do not find these ingredients easily and often use Ungchu or 4-year-old ginseng because the cost of ingredients becomes more expensive. In fact, there is an opinion that four-year-old ginseng has no problem because saponin, the effective ingredient of ginseng, is not much different from six-year-old ginseng. Some companies use ginseng for one to two years or replace it with Astragalus propinquus that tastes similar.

Gallery

See also 

 Baeksuk
 Dak-bokkeum-tang
 Ori-tang
 List of chicken dishes
 List of soups
 List of Korean dishes

References

External links 
 
 

Korean chicken dishes
Korean soups and stews
Chicken soups